George Willard Conable (1866-1933), AIA, was an American architect practicing in New York City in the early to mid 20th century specializing in churches.

Biography
George W. Conable was born in Cortland, New York on October 4, 1866. He graduated from Cortland State Normal School in 1886, and from Cornell University in 1890.

In 1905 he was an assistant to noted architect Ernest Flagg and prepared plans and working drawings for the Singer Building.  His office was at 15 Myrtle Avenue, Jamaica, Queens in 1908, 46 West 24th Street in 1918. He entered into a brief partnership with Hobart Upjohn as the firm of Upjohn & Conable of 96 Fifth Avenue, New York, in 1911. He is best known as the architect of Holy Trinity Lutheran Church (New York City) (1908) and Messiah Evangelical Lutheran Church (1926)

He died in Tampa, Florida on January 2, 1933.

Works as George W. Conable
1908: German Evangelical Lutheran Church of 164 West 100th Street, 90 East Amsterdam Ave and 100th Street, a two-storey brick and stone church and parsonage for $50,000
1916: Queensboro Hospital for Contagious Diseases, Parsons Boulevard and Grand Central Parkway in Jamaica, Queens.
1918: 179-181 West Houston Street, single-storey office, for Congress Warehouse & Forwarding Co.; J. L Wolff, Pres of 474 West Broadway, for $5,000
1919: 179-83 West Houston Street, single-storey brick garage, for Congress Warehouse & Forwarding Co.; J. L Wolff, Pres of 474 West Broadway, for $5,000
1926: Messiah Evangelical Lutheran Church, 198-200 Sherman Avenue, two-story brick school and chapel for $40,000
1926: Trinity Lutheran Church (Queens, New York), overseer for architect John William Cresswell Corbusier, listed on the National Register of Historic Places in 2008.
1928: Jamaica Chamber of Commerce Building, listed on the National Register of Historic Places in 1983.

Works as Upjohn & Conable
1909: Rye Town Park-Bathing Complex and Oakland Beach, added to the National Register of Historic Places in 2003.
1911: a brick and stone fence rear of brick residence, 546 West 153rd Street for Washington Heights Evangelical Lutheran Church of 546 West 153rd Street for $250

References	

1866 births
1933 deaths
American ecclesiastical architects
Defunct architecture firms based in New York City
Architects of Lutheran churches
Cornell University alumni
State University of New York at Cortland alumni
20th-century American architects